Gotha station is the main station of Gotha in the German state of Thuringia. It is served by InterCity trains and every two hours by Intercity-Express trains on the Thuringian Railway. Services on the Gotha–Leinefelde line to the north also serve the station. Passenger services on the Ohra Valley Railway (Ohratalbahn) to the south ended in December 2011.

History 
Gotha station was built in 1847, when the local section of the Thuringian line was completed between Halle and Bebra. Gotha was at this time the provincial capital of Saxe-Gotha and already had 15,000 inhabitants. Accordingly, the station was built in a neoclassical style. In 1870 the second line was built from Gotha, running via Mühlhausen to Leinefelde (continuing to Göttingen). The third and last line connecting to Gotha station was the Ohra Valley Railway opened in 1876 to Ohrdruf and to the line to Würzburg at Gräfenroda in 1892.

In 1894 the Gotha tramway was opened. The station was the junction of several tram lines. In 1929, the Thuringian Forest Railway (Thüringerwaldbahn), an overland interurban tramway was opened from Gotha station, running across the city tramlines and continuing to Bad Tabarz via Waltershausen and Friedrichroda. In the Second World War the central section and west wing of the station were destroyed in air strikes; the east wing and the entrance area survived. Some of it still has not been repaired.

In 2007, the station forecourt was completely restructured and the stop on the Thuringian Forest Railway was relocated.

Services
The following services stopped at Gotha station in 2019.

Long distance:

Regional services:
 Regional-Express 1 Göttingen–Leinefelde–Mühlhausen–Gotha–Erfurt–Jena–Gera–Chemnitz/Zwickau (Gotha–Leinefelde railway)
 Regionalbahn (RB) 20 Eisenach–Gotha–Erfurt–Weimar–Naumburg–Weißenfels–Halle
Between Eisenach and Gotha and between Erfurt and Gotha, shuttle service 22A runs daily from Monday to Friday, so that the Gotha has a service every half-hour clock during the main traffic period to its two major neighbouring cities
 RB 53 Gotha–Bad Langensalza
 From the forecourt, the Thuringian Forest Railway (interurban tramway to Waltershausen)

References

Railway stations in Gotha
station
Buildings and structures in Gotha (district)
Railway stations in Germany opened in 1847